Dr David Clouston FRSE (13 December 1871–18 April 1948) was a Scottish agriculturalist, horticulturalist and author. He served as Agricultural Advisor to India from 1923 to 1929. His expertise lay especially in the subject of grasses.

Life
He was born on Orkney on 13 December 1871.

He studied agriculture to postgraduate level at the University of Edinburgh, receiving his D.Sc. in 1935.

In 1932 he was elected a Fellow of the Royal Society of Edinburgh, his proposers were James Drever, Sir William Wright Smith, Ernest Shearer and Sir Thomas Henry Holland.

He died in St Ola on Orkney on 18 April 1948.

Publications
See
Lessons on Indian Agriculture (1920)
Identification of Grasses in Non-flowering Condition
Plant Diseases of the Garden (1932)
From the Orcades to Ind (1936)
The Establishment and Care of Fine Turf for Lawns and Sports Grounds (1939)
The Story of the Orkney and Zetland Association (1946)

References

External links
 

1871 births
1948 deaths
Fellows of the Royal Society of Edinburgh
People from Orkney